This is a list of rivers flowing through Liechtenstein.

 Rhine/Rhein, flows into the North Sea. It forms most of the country's border with Switzerland.
 Samina River/Saminabach, flows into the Ill. It originates in the Principality and continues into Austria.

Additionally, there are two more prominent rivulets and one natural lake.

 Mölibach 
 Spiersbach
 Gampriner Seele (lake)

Liechtenstein
Rivers